Déline Water Aerodrome  is adjacent to Déline, Northwest Territories, Canada, on Great Bear Lake. It is open from mid-May until mid-October.

See also
Déline Airport

References

Registered aerodromes in the Sahtu Region
Seaplane bases in the Northwest Territories